Nanozoanthus is a monotypic genus of corals belonging to the monotypic family Nanozoanthidae. The only species is Nanozoanthus harenaceus.

References

Macrocnemina
Hexacorallia genera
Monotypic cnidarian genera